The Recipe is the third solo studio album by American rapper Mack 10. It was released October 6, 1998 via Hoo-Bangin'/Priority Records. Production was handled by Young Tre, Binky Mack, DJ U-Neek, Rhythm D, Rick "Dutch" Cousin, Slice, Clint "Mr. Payback" Sands, KLC, Snoop Dogg, and Mack 10 himself. It features guest appearances from Big Pun, Big Tray Deee, Boo Kapone, Buckshot, CJ Mac, Eazy-E, Fat Joe, Foxy Brown, Gerald Levert, Jayo Felony, Jermaine Dupri, Master P, MC Eiht, Mystikal, Ol' Dirty Bastard, Road Dawgs, Snoop Dogg, Techniec, Thump da Hooddwella, KoЯn, and all members of Allfrumtha I, The Comrads and Westside Connection.

The album debuted at number 15 on the Billboard 200, number 6 on the Top R&B/Hip-Hop Albums, and was certified Gold by the Recording Industry Association of America on December 3, 1998. Its lead single, "Let the Games Begin", peaked at number 54 on the Billboard Hot 100. Along with singles, music videos were directed for "Let the Games Begin" and "Money's Just a Touch Away".

Track listing

Sample credits
Track 3 contains an interpolation of "Dazz" written by Edward Irons, Reggie Hargis and Raymond Ransom and performed by Brick
Track 6 contains an interpolation of "Love Is Just a Touch Away" written by Freddie Jackson and Barry Eastmond and performed by Freddie Jackson
Track 8 contains an interpolation of "Get Down Tonight" written by Harry Wayne Casey and performed by KC and the Sunshine Band
Track 9 contains a sample from "Genius of Love" written by Adrian Belew, Steven Stanley, Tina Weymouth and Chris Frantz and performed by the Tom Tom Club
Track 11 contains a sample from "Heartbeat" written by Kenton Nix and performed by Taana Gardner
Track 17 contains elements of "Should I Stay or Should I Go" written by Nicholas Headon, Michael Jones, Paul Simonon and John Strummer and performed by The Clash

Chart history

Certifications

References

External links

1998 albums
Mack 10 albums
Priority Records albums
Albums produced by Rhythum D